Lingbao Gold Company Limited is a state-owned gold mining enterprise in Lingbao, Henan, China. It mainly engaged in the mining, smelting and refining of gold, silver, copper products and sulphuric acid. It has 49 mining and exploration rights in Henan, Xinjiang, Jiangxi, Inner Mongolia and Gansu.

It was listed on the Hong Kong Stock Exchange in 2006 with IPO price of HK$3.3 per share.

See also
Gold mining in China

References

External links
Lingbao Gold Company Limited

Companies listed on the Hong Kong Stock Exchange
Gold mining companies of China
Companies established in 2002
H shares
Companies based in Henan
2002 establishments in China